Puviraja Pandaram (died 1591) ruled the Jaffna kingdom during a period of chaos during and after the death of his father Cankili I in 1565. He became king in 1561 following a local uprising against Cankili I. Although he was the nominal king, Cankili I wielded real power behind the throne until his death in 1565. After Cankili's death, Puviraja Pandaram lost power to one Kasi Nainar and Periyapillai. After the death or abdication of Periyapillai in 1582, Puviraja Pandarm was nominated as the king for the second time.

During his second tenure he attempted to wrest the control of the pearl-rich Mannar Island from the Portuguese by attacking the fort by sea and land. He was defeated in both attempts.

After the occupation of Kandy by Rajasinha I of Sitawaka, Puviraja Pandaram gave refuge and protection to the sole surviving member of the Kandyan Royal family, the infant, Princess Kusumasana, who was baptized, as Dona Catherina (The daughter of Karaliedde Bandara).

Eventually Puviraja Pandaram was captured and beheaded by Portuguese in a battle during the second Portuguese expedition against Jaffna Kingdom led by André Furtado de Mendonça in 1591. He was succeeded by his son Ethirimana Cinkam.

Notes

References

1591 deaths
Kings of Jaffna
Sri Lankan Hindus
Sri Lankan Tamil royalty
Year of birth unknown
16th-century monarchs in Asia